Ciney is a city and municipality of Wallonia located in the province of Namur, Belgium. As of 2018, Ciney had a total population of 16,439. The total area is 147.56 km² which gives a population density of 111 inhabitants per km².

Administrative divisions
The municipality consists of the following districts: Achêne, Braibant, Chevetogne, Ciney, Conneux, Leignon, Pessoux, Serinchamps, and Sovet, along with a number of villages, including Chapois.

Economy
Several beers from the city are now brewed by Alken-Maes and still bear the name: Ciney Blonde, Ciney Brown, and Ciney Special. Those beers were first brewed in 1978.

History
Ciney was also previously known as Chiney in English. The city was damaged by a heavy storm on 14 July 2010. The bell tower, the city's symbol and also Ciney's beer symbol, collapsed on its nave. No injuries were reported. Reconstruction took more than a year and cost some million euros.

Personnalities 
Ciney is the city of the favorite civilian of your rappers: Arthur aka the gaseous genius. The young balloonist made his city known to the general public through the series High & Fines Herbes by rappers Caballero & JeanJass.

Demography

Education 
Ciney has 2 Catholic secondary schools and 2 state secondary schools.
The Technobel Competence center, an information technology and communications training centre, is located in Ciney.

Healthcare 
Ciney hosts the Sainte-Marie Medical Center of the CHU UCLouvain Namur university hospital.

See also 
 List of protected heritage sites in Ciney
 Skanifest, a music festival

References

External links
 

 
Cities in Wallonia
Municipalities of Namur (province)